Radu Muntean (born 8 June 1971 in Bucharest) is a Romanian film director and screenwriter. He is a central figure of the Romanian New Wave.

Radu graduated from the Theater and Film Academy in Bucharest in 1994, where he directed three short films. Since 1996, he has directed over 400 commercials and has won over 40 national and international awards in various advertising festivals. His feature debut, The Rage, was awarded Best First Film by The Romanian Filmmakers Union, and Best Photography at the 2003 Transilvania International Film Festival. His second feature, The Paper Will Be Blue, as well as Boogie are  representative of the Romanian New Wave.

His 2015 film One Floor Below was screened in the Un Certain Regard section at the 2015 Cannes Film Festival.

Filmography
The Rage (Furia) (2002)
The Paper Will Be Blue (2006)
Boogie (2008)
Tuesday, After Christmas (2010)
One Floor Below (2015)
Alice T. (2018)
Întregalde (2021)

References

External links
Biography

Romanian film directors
1971 births
Film people from Bucharest
Living people